Barbaloba meleagrisellae is a moth in the family Blastobasidae. It is found in Costa Rica.

The length of the forewings is about 5.1 mm. The forewings are pale brown intermixed with dark-brown scales and a few brownish-orange scales. The hindwings are translucent pale brown.

Etymology
The specific epithet is derived from Greek Meleagris, a genus of birds that includes the turkey, a bird in which males have a beardlike process on the anterior part of the breast, and refers to the setose (bristled) lobelike process originating from the ventral part of the valva of the male genitalia.

References

Moths described in 2013
Blastobasidae